Carwitzer See is a lake at Carwitz in the municipality Feldberger Seenlandschaft in the Mecklenburgische Seenplatte district,  Mecklenburg-Vorpommern, Germany. At an elevation of 83.8 m, its surface area is 7.22 km² incl. the lake Zansen.

External links 
 

Lakes of Mecklenburg-Western Pomerania